Yaya Mamadou Dissa (born 18 September 1975) is a Malian international footballer who last played for Division d'Honneur side Niort Saint-Florent.

Career
Born in Nioro, Dissa began playing youth football for local side AS Mandé. He played as a striker and joined the senior side of AS Commune IV, before moving to Djoliba Athletic Club in 1996. Dissa led Djoliba to the Malian league title in the 1996–97 season, and led the league in goals scored.

His strong performances in the Malian league led to a move to Saudi Premier League side Al-Shabab. At age 26, he moved to Greece where he would play in the Greek Superleague for Athinaikos F.C., Kerkyra F.C. and Patraikos F.C.

Dissa signed a two-year contract with French Championnat National side Chamois Niortais F.C. in 2004.

References

External links
Yaya Dissa profile at chamoisfc79.fr

1975 births
Living people
Malian footballers
Mali international footballers
Association football forwards
Chamois Niortais F.C. players
Al-Shabab FC (Riyadh) players
Athinaikos F.C. players
A.O. Kerkyra players
Patraikos F.C. players
Saudi Professional League players
Ligue 2 players
People from Kayes Region
Malian expatriate footballers
Malian expatriate sportspeople in Saudi Arabia
Expatriate footballers in Saudi Arabia
21st-century Malian people